Events in the year 2022 in Seychelles.

Incumbents 

 President: Wavel Ramkalawan

Events 
Ongoing — COVID-19 pandemic in Seychelles

Sports 

 15 July – 24 July: Seychelles at the 2022 World Athletics Championships
 28 July – 8 August: Seychelles at the 2022 Commonwealth Games

Deaths 

 28 January – Joseph Belmont, politician, vice president (2004–2010) (born 1947)

References 

 
2020s in Seychelles
Years of the 21st century in Seychelles
Seychelles
Seychelles